Chinese ginseng may refer to:
 Panax ginseng, the Asian ginseng or Korean ginseng
 Panax notoginseng, the South China ginseng or notoginseng